Timeagain is an album by jazz saxophonist David Sanborn that was released by Verve in 2003.

Critical reception

Paula Edelstein of AllMusic writes, "The all-masterful Time Again has something for everyone. It's romantic, it's funky, it's laid-back, and it's definitely one that should be in your music collection. In a sense, David Sanborn has pulled off one of the best recordings of his career."

Geoffrey Himes of JazzTimes concludes his review with, "Once again Sanborn has demonstrated how it can be done right."

Track listing

Personnel 
 David Sanborn – alto saxophone, acoustic piano (1, 3, 6, 7, 8)
 Gil Goldstein – rhythm arrangements (1, 2, 6, 10), acoustic piano (2, 6, 9, 10), string arrangements (4, 5, 8), horn arrangements (9)
 Ricky Peterson – keyboards (4, 5, 9), synthesizer bass programming (7), drum loops (7)
 Russell Malone – guitars (1-7, 9, 10)
 Christian McBride – bass
 Steve Gadd – drums
 Mike Mainieri – vibraphone (1-4, 6-10)
 Don Alias – percussion (1, 3, 4, 6, 7)
 Luis Quintero – additional percussion (3, 4, 7)
 Lawrence Feldman – alto flute (9), bass flute (9)
 Randy Brecker – trumpet (9), flugelhorn (9)
 Jesse Levy – cello (4, 5, 8)
 Caryl Paisner – cello (4, 5, 8)
 Alfred Brown – viola (4, 5, 8)
 Olivia Koppell – viola (4, 5, 8)
 Lani Groves – vocals (2)
 David Lasley – vocals (2)
 Arnold McCuller – vocals (2)
 Valerie Pinkston – vocals (2)

Production 
 Stewart Levine – producer 
 Joe Ferla – recording, mixing 
 Al Schmitt – mixing
 Rik Pekkonen – vocal recording (2)
 Bernie Grundman – mastering
 Hollis King – art direction 
 Isabelle Wong – design 
 Henry Leutwyler – photography 
 Patrick Rains & Associates – management

Track information and credits adapted from the album's liner notes.

Charts

References

2003 albums
David Sanborn albums
Albums produced by Stewart Levine
Verve Records albums

Albums recorded at Capitol Studios